Snake oil is a term used to describe deceptive marketing, health care fraud, or a scam. Similarly, "snake oil salesman" is a common expression used to describe someone who sells, promotes, or is a general proponent of some valueless or fraudulent cure, remedy, or solution. The term comes from the "snake oil" that used to be sold as a cure-all elixir for many kinds of physiological problems. Many 19th-century United States and 18th-century European entrepreneurs advertised and sold mineral oil (often mixed with various active and inactive household herbs, spices, drugs, and compounds, but containing no snake-derived substances whatsoever) as "snake oil liniment", making claims about its efficacy as a panacea. Patent medicines that claimed to be a panacea were extremely common from the 18th century until the 20th, particularly among vendors masking addictive drugs such as cocaine, amphetamine, alcohol, and opium-based concoctions or elixirs, to be sold at medicine shows as medication or products promoting health.

History
Oil from Chinese water snakes has for centuries been used in Chinese traditional medicine to treat joint pain such as arthritis and bursitis. It has been suggested that the use of snake oil in the United States may have originated with Chinese railway laborers in the mid-19th century, who worked long days of physical toil. Chinese snake oil may have had real benefits due to its high concentration of the omega−3 fatty acid eicosapentaenoic acid (EPA)—more than that of salmon; the rattlesnake oil later sold by charlatans did not contain a significant amount of omega−3. In a modern study, erabu sea-snake oil was found to significantly improve the ability of mice to learn mazes, and their swimming endurance, over mice fed lard.

Patent medicines originated in England, where a patent was granted to Richard Stoughton's elixir in 1712. There were no federal regulations in the United States concerning the safety and effectiveness of drugs until the 1906 Pure Food and Drug Act. Thus, the widespread marketing and availability of dubiously advertised patent medicines without known properties or origin persisted in the US for a much greater number of years than in Europe.

In 18th-century Europe, especially in the UK, viper oil had been commonly recommended for many afflictions, including the ones for which oil from the rattlesnake (pit viper), a type of viper native to America, was subsequently favored to treat rheumatism and skin diseases. Though there are accounts of oil obtained from the fat of various vipers in the Western world, the claims of its effectiveness as a medicine have never been thoroughly examined, and its efficacy is unknown. It is also likely that much of the snake oil sold by Western entrepreneurs was illegitimate, and did not contain ingredients derived from any kind of snake. Snake oil in the United Kingdom and the United States probably contained modified mineral oil. William Rockefeller Sr. (1810-1906), the father of John D. Rockefeller, peddled literal snake oil.

In popular culture, a particular kind of confidence trick is associated with the snake-oil salesman - the traveling salesman purports to be a doctor (with false credentials), selling fake medicines with boisterous marketing hype, often supported by  pseudo-scientific evidence. To increase sales, an accomplice in the crowd (a shill) will often attest to the value of the product in an effort to provoke buying enthusiasm. The "doctor" will leave town before his customers realize they have been cheated. This scam is often associated with the Old West, and appears in some Western films, but the  judgment condemning snake oil as medicine took place in Rhode Island, and involved snake oil manufactured in Massachusetts.

From cure-all to quackery

Clark Stanley's Snake Oil Liniment – produced by Clark Stanley, the "Rattlesnake King" – was tested by the United States government's Bureau of Chemistry, the precursor to the Food and Drug Administration (FDA) in 1916. It was found to contain: mineral oil, 1% fatty oil (assumed to be tallow), capsaicin from chili peppers, turpentine, and camphor.

In 1916, subsequent to the passage of the Pure Food and Drug Act in 1906, Clark Stanley's Snake Oil Liniment was examined by the Bureau of Chemistry, and found to be drastically overpriced and of limited value. As a result, Stanley faced federal prosecution for peddling mineral oil in a fraudulent manner as snake oil. In his 1916 civil hearing instigated by federal prosecutors in the U.S. District Court for Rhode Island, Stanley pleaded nolo contendere (no contest) to the allegations against him, giving no admission of guilt. His plea was accepted, and as a result, he was fined $20 (about $ in ).

The term snake oil has since been established in popular culture as a reference to any worthless concoction sold as medicine, and has been extended to describe a wide-ranging degree of fraudulent goods, services, ideas, and activities such as worthless rhetoric in politics. By further extension, a snake oil salesman is commonly used in English to describe a quack, huckster, or charlatan.

Modern implications 

False health products described by medical experts as "snake oil" continue to be marketed during the 21st century, including herbal medicines, dietary supplements, products such as Tibetan singing bowls (when used for healing) and treatments such as vaginal steaming. The company Goop has been accused of "selling snake oil" in some of its health products and recommendations.

During the COVID-19 pandemic, the Xinhua News Agency claimed that the herbal product Shuanghuanglian can prevent or treat infections from coronaviruses, stimulating sales across the United States, Russia and China. However, these claims have no basis in science.

See also
 Beecham's Pills
 Daffy's Elixir
 Dalby's Carminative
 False advertising
 goop (company)
 Hadacol
 Homeopathy
 Lydia Pinkham
 MLM companies
 Nine oils
 Patent medicine
 Turlington's Balsam

References

External links 

Patent medicines
Ointments